Sé is a southeast civil parish in the Macau Peninsula of Macau. It is the second largest peninsular district in Macau after the civil parish of Nossa Senhora de Fátima. The parish area is named for the Igreja da Sé.

This parish was one of five in the former Municipality of Macau, one of Macau's two municipalities that were abolished on 31 December 2001 by Law No. 17/2001, following the 1999 transfer of sovereignty over Macau from Portugal to China. While their administrative functions have since been removed, these parishes are still retained nominally.

Its western part is the historic financial center of Macau. Praia Grande Central Business District is in the south-central part of the district. All banks (over 20) in Macau have offices here.

There are numerous quality restaurants, 4-star and 5-star hotels in this district. High-rise buildings exist on the eastern ZAPE and NAPE zone, which was reclaimed from the sea, with a ferry terminal located on the eastern edge of the parish.
 Area: 
 Population: 29,000 (least populated region on the peninsula)
 Population density: 20,881 persons per km2 (the least on the peninsula)

Institutions
Macau government:
 Legislative Assembly of Macau
 Macau General Post Office
 Various government agencies in China Plaza, including the Identification Services Bureau
 Statistics and Census Service
 Education and Youth Affairs Bureau head office
 Civil Aviation Authority head office: 18th floor of the Cheng Feng Commercial Center

PRC Central Government:
 Liaison Office of the Central People's Government in the Macau SAR
 Office of the Commissioner of the Ministry of Foreign Affairs of the People's Republic of China in the Macao Special Administrative Region

Diplomatic missions:
 Taipei Economic and Cultural Office in Macau
 Philippine Consulate General in Macau SAR
 Consulate General of Portugal in Macau and Hong Kong
 Consulate General of Angola Macau SAR
 Consulate General of Mozambique in Macau SAR

Economy

Within the parish is the Edifício CNAC, the head office of Air Macau. Previously the Air Macau head office was in the Edifício Tai Wah in Sé.

Media
O Clarim has its head office in Edf. Ngan Fai (銀輝大廈) in Sé. Ponto Final has its head office at Travessa do Bispo, nº1.

Healthcare
Macau's public hospital, Conde S. Januário Hospital, is in Sé. The Macau government also operates the Centro de Saúde Porto Interior (海傍區衛生中心) in Hoi Pong Koi.

Education

Macao Polytechnic University in Sé provides tertiary education. Prior to 1998 the school's central building was used as the Liceu de Macau, a public Portuguese-curriculum secondary school.

Primary and secondary schools
The sole public school currently in operation in Sé is the Macao Conservatory School of Dance, as it is categorized by the Education and Youth Affairs Bureau as a public secondary school program. It is located on the 3rd and 4th floor of the Edifício Centro Hotline (獲多利中心). The conservatory's theater school is also in Sé, within the Edificio Jardim San On (新安花園).

Tuition-free private primary and secondary schools
  (聖羅撒女子中學) Chinese section - Preschool through secondary school
 Colégio de Santa Rosa de Lima English section (聖羅撒英文中學) - Primary and secondary school
 Concordia School for Special Education (Escola Concórdia para Ensino Especial; 協同特殊教育學校) - Preschool through secondary school and special education, located on the ground floor to third floor of Edificio Chu Kuan (珠光大廈)
 Kao Yip Middle School - Preschool through secondary school
 Lingnan Middle School (Escola Ling Nam; 澳門嶺南中學) - Preschool through secondary school
  (Escola Pui Tou de Macau; 澳門培道中學) - Main campus, preschool through secondary school
 Escola Tong Sin Tong (同善堂中學) - Preschool through secondary
 Sheng Kung Hui Choi Kou School Macau (Sheng Kung Hui Escola Choi Kou (Macau); 聖公會(澳門)蔡高中學) Preschool and night secondary school campus

Private non-free preschools and primary and secondary schools
  (聖若瑟教區中學)
 Millennium Secondary School (Escola Secundária Millennium/創新中學) - Senior high school
 Macau Portuguese School - Primary and secondary school
 St. Anthony's Kindergarten and Nursery (Centro de Educação Infantil Santo António; 聖安東尼幼稚園)

Colleges and universities
The original campus (NAPE1) of the University of Saint Joseph is in Sé. The main campus of the Macau Polytechnic University is also located in Sé.

Public library

The parish is home the Macao Public Library system's Library in Ho Yin Garden (Biblioteca do Jardim Comendador Ho Yin; 何賢公園圖書館). The library, a  two story facility, first opened in 1993. It reopened on 10 February 2009 after it had been temporarily closed in 2005 for NAPE renovations.

Casino and hotels
 Casa Real Casino
 Casino Lisboa
 Grand Lisboa
 L'Arc Macau
 Mandarin Oriental, Macau
 MGM Macau
 Wynn Macau

Tourist attractions
 Comendador Ho Yin Garden
 Dr Carlos d'Assumpcao Park
 Garden of the Arts
 Grand Prix Museum
 Handover Gifts Museum of Macao
 Heritage Exhibition of a Traditional Pawnshop Business
 Kuan Tai Temple
 Lotus Square
 Macao Cultural Centre
 Macau Fisherman's Wharf
 Macau Forum
 Macau Military Club
 Macau Museum of Art
 Macau Science Center
 Macau Tower
 Macau Wine Museum
 Nam Van Lake
 Sai Van Lake
 Sands Macao
 Santa Casa de Misericórdia
 Sé Church
 Senado Square
 St. Dominic's Church

Transport
 Ferries to Hong Kong and mainland China leave from the Outer Harbour Ferry Terminal.
 There is an extensive and frequent bus network in the district, with key stops at Praça de Ferreira do Amaral, Rua do Campo, and Praceta 24 de Junho.

See also
Avenida Almeida Ribeiro

References

External links

Freguesias da RAEM

 
Macau Peninsula